Calliergonaceae is a family of mosses belonging to the order Hypnales.

Genera:
 Harpidium (Sull.) Spruce
 Limprichtia Loeske
 Sarmentypnum Tuom. & T.J.Kop.

References

Hypnales
Moss families